Marc Bijsterbosch (born 31 December 1993) is a Dutch professional pool player. Bijsterbosch won the 10-Ball event at the 2017 European Pool Championship,
and reached the final of the 2014 Slovenian Open Euro Tour event, where he lost 9–4 to Denis Grabe.

Titles
 2017 European Pool Championship 10-ball

References

External links

 Marc Bijsterbosch  on the Euro Tour website

1993 births
Living people
Dutch pool players